Abner Clark Harding (February 10, 1807 – July 19, 1874) was a U.S. Representative from Illinois.

Biography
Abner C. Harding was born in East Hampton, Connecticut on February 10, 1807. He attended Hamilton College, Clinton, New York, where he studied law. He was admitted to the bar and commenced practice in Oneida County, New York, about 1827. In 1838, he moved to Monmouth, Illinois, and continued practicing law. He served as member of the State constitutional convention in 1848, and was elected to the Illinois House of Representatives the same year, serving until 1850.

During the American Civil War, Harding enlisted as a private in the Union Army in the 83rd Illinois Volunteer Infantry Regiment. Later he was commissioned as a colonel, and was promoted to brigadier general in March 1863. He was forced to resign due to deteriorating eyesight a few months later.

From 1865 to 1869, Harding served as a Republican member of Congress. During the 39th Congress, he served as Chairman of the Committee on the Militia. However, he was not a candidate for reelection in 1868 after serving in the 40th Congress, and later engaged in banking and railroad building. He was a founder and trustee of Monmouth College. He died in Monmouth, Illinois on July 19, 1874, and was interred in Monmouth Cemetery.

See also

List of American Civil War generals (Union)

References

 Retrieved on January 29, 2009

External links

1807 births
1874 deaths
Monmouth College
People from East Hampton, Connecticut
People of Illinois in the American Civil War
Illinois lawyers
Republican Party members of the Illinois House of Representatives
Hamilton College (New York) alumni
Union Army generals
Republican Party members of the United States House of Representatives from Illinois
19th-century American politicians
19th-century American lawyers